John Mulcair (January 23, 1889 – March 19, 1953) was a Canadian professional ice hockey player. He played with the Montreal Shamrocks of the National Hockey Association.

References

External links
Jack Mulcair at JustSportsStats

1889 births
1953 deaths
Anglophone Quebec people
Canadian ice hockey left wingers
Montreal Shamrocks players
Ice hockey people from Montreal